Graduados, historias que no se olvidan is a 2013 Chilean telenovela, a remake of the 2012 Argentine telenovela Graduados. It was aired by Chilevisión, and the man actors are Marcial Tagle, Fernanda Urrejola, Ricardo Fernández and Bárbara Ruiz-Tagle.

Plot
The telenovela began in a 1993 high-school graduation. María Laura Falsetti was the girlfriend of Pablo Flores, the school's bully. She left the graduation party when she saw him having sex with another student. Andrés Jalifa, who was secretly in love with her, helped her to leave the graduation party, and had sex in the car. Unaware of this one-night relation, Clemente Falsetti ordered his daughter and Flores to get married, as she got pregnant.

The narration makes then a time skip to 2013. Pablo works at Clemente's firm, and Andrés is a dog walker, hired by chance by María Laura. She confirmed with a DNA test that her son Martín was the biological son of Andrés, not the son of Pablo as she had always thought. Most plots revolve around the consequences of this reveal.

Production
The telenovela is a remake of the successful 2012 Argentine telenovela Graduados. It is the first remake produced at the channel Chilevisión. The first actors who signed for the work were Fernanda Urrejola, Marcial Tagle and Ricardo Fernández. The Argentine telenovela made an extensive use of 1980s music, in most cases 1980s Argentine Rock. The Chilean remake used both Chilean music bands, such as Upa! and Los Prisioneros, and Argentine bands highly successful in Chile, such as Soda Stereo, Charly García and Virus.

Unlike the Argentine telenovela, the Chilean remake is not focused in nostalgia of the 1980s, but in the 1990s. Mirroring similar productions from the Argentine telenovela, the production included an homage to the old Chilean TV show "Extra Jóvenes", in a flashback with the main characters attending to it. The TV host Daniel Fuenzalida, who worked at that program, took part in the fiction.

Reception
Graduados was first aired in March 2013, and got more rating than competitor channels but by a narrow margin. On March 3 it got 13.9 rating points, against Mundos opuestos 2 in Channel 13 and Apuesto por ti in TVN, both with 13.7 points, and Pablo Escobar, el patrón del mal by Mega with 13 points.

Cast
 Marcial Tagle as Andrés Jalifa
 Fernanda Urrejola as María Laura "Loli" Falsetti
 Ricardo Fernández as Pablo Flores
 Bárbara Ruiz-Tagle as Ximena Benítez / Patricia Rojas
 Cristián Carvajal as Francisco "Tuca" Allende
 Elvira Cristi as Verónica Sarmiento
 Pedro Campos as Martín Flores/Jalifa
 Eduardo Barril as Clemente Falsetti
 Fernando Farías as Amir Jalifa
 María Elena Duvauchelle as Hannah Talla
 Natalia Valdebenito as Alejandra Aguirre
 Guido Vecchiola as Guillermo Aliaga
 Elisa Alemparte as Claudia Jalifa
 César Sepúlveda as Augusto Flores
 Natalia Grez as Clara
 Paulina Hunt as Betty
 Aldo Parodi as Walter
 Carolina Mestrovic as Sofía Matic
 Felipe Álvarez as Juan José Correa "Juanjo"

Guest cast
 Claudia di Girolamo as Cristina "Titi" Arregui
 Juan Falcón as Fernando Ponte
 Alessandra Guerzoni as Juana López
 Sandra O'Ryan as Inés Matic
 Jaime McManus as Daniel Jalifa
 Catherine Mazoyer as Sandra Assad
 Macarena Sánchez as Azul Vega
 Javiera Osorio as Luna Ponte
 Benito Quercia as Musalem Jalifa
 Grimanesa Jiménez as Marta Quiñones
 Gabrio Cavalla as Dr. Alfredo Ripstein

References

External links

 Official site 
 

Chilean telenovelas
2013 telenovelas
2013 Chilean television series debuts
2014 Chilean television series endings
Chilevisión telenovelas
Spanish-language telenovelas